Carlos Armando Juárez Flores (born 21 July 1965) is a Guatemalan chess International Master (IM) since 1987 and a FIDE master (FM) since 1983, and his highest rating was 2435 (January 1998). He is ranked best player in Guatemala.

He won the Guatemalian chess championship 27 times, in the years 1980, 1983–1988, 1991, 1993–1995, 1998–2011, 2012, and 2014–2017.

References

1965 births
Chess International Masters
Guatemalan chess players
Living people